Alice M. Emmons (born February 14, 1955) is an American politician in the state of Vermont. She is a member of the Vermont House of Representatives, sitting as a Democrat from the Windsor-3-2 district, having been first elected in 1982.

References

1955 births
Living people
People from Springfield, Vermont
University of New Hampshire alumni
Democratic Party members of the Vermont House of Representatives
Women state legislators in Vermont
21st-century American politicians
21st-century American women politicians